Johannes Hiob (17 May 1907 Türi Parish – 7 August 1942 Vorkuta prison camp, Russia) was an Estonian composer and organist.

Works
 1931 cantate "Jesaja kuulutamine"
 1935 cantate "Lunastav Issand"
 1935 cantate "Jõulukantaat"
 1937 oratorium "Suitsev Siinai"
 1939 opera "Võidu hind"

References

1907 births
1942 deaths
20th-century Estonian composers
Estonian organists
People who died in the Gulag
Estonian people who died in Soviet detention